The Comal blind salamander or Honey Creek Cave blind salamander (Eurycea tridentifera) is a small species of aquatic, lungless salamander native to the United States. It is endemic to a small region at the junction of Comal, Bexar and Kendall Counties in Texas. It is 1.5 to 3.0 in long, with a slender body and external gills, and is an overall translucent pink color.

The salamander depends on a constant supply of clean, cool water from the Edwards Aquifer. Hunting tiny snails, shrimp, and other aquatic invertebrates by sensing water pressure waves created by prey in the still underground waters where it lives.

Conservation status 
The Comal blind salamander is listed as a threatened species in the state of Texas. Due to its extremely limited geographic range, its primary threat is contamination of the water sources in the area.

References 

  (2000): Phylogenetic relationships of central Texas hemidactyliine plethodontid salamanders, genus Eurycea, and a taxonomic revision of the group. Herpetological Monographs 14: 1-80.
  (2001): A new species of subterranean blind salamander (Plethodontidae: Hemidactyliini: Eurycea: Typhlomolge) from Austin, Texas, and a systematic revision of central Texas paedomorphic salamanders. Herpetologica 57: 266–280.
Herps of Texas: Eurycea tridentifera
Amphibian Species of the World: Eurycea tridentifera
IUCN Red List: Eurycea tridentifera

Tridentifera
Cave salamanders
Amphibians described in 1965